2007 Korfball European Bowl is the European Championship "B" of korfball played by the countries that have not qualified for the World Championships. It was split into two divisions, Western and Eastern. 

The champions of both divisions played the final during the 2007 Korfball World Championship and the winner was Slovakia.

Western division
The western division was played in Luxembourg, on May 12 and 13, with the participation of 6 national teams and the winner was Wales.

It was the first official performance for some of the national teams: Ireland, Scotland and Wales, and the international debut of Sweden. Luxembourg and France were the two other participants.

Eastern division
The Eastern division was played in Serbia, on June 16 and 17, with the participation of 5 national teams and the winner was Slovakia.

European Bowl 2007 Final
The final was held in Brno (Czech Republic), in the 2007 Korfball World Championship.

See also
International Korfball Federation
Korfball European Bowl

External links
Website of the European Bowl 2007 - Western division
Western division - IKF website
Eastern division - IKF website
International Korfball Federation

Korfball European Bowl
Korfball European Bowl